Ireland competed at the 2012 Winter Youth Olympics in Innsbruck, Austria. The Irish team consisted of three officials and one athlete, a female alpine skier.

Alpine skiing

Ireland had only one entry in the 2012 Winter Youth Olympics

Girl

See also
Ireland at the 2012 Summer Olympics

References

2012 in Irish sport
Nations at the 2012 Winter Youth Olympics
Ireland at the Youth Olympics